Neil Rafferty is an American politician and current member of the Alabama House of Representatives, representing District 54. Winning his seat in the 2018 elections, Rafferty assumed office on November 7, 2018. His current term ends on November 7, 2022. Representative Rafferty's is a member of the Democratic Party.

Rafferty is a former member of the United States Marine Corps and veteran of the Global War on Terrorism. Prior to his election to the Alabama House of Representatives,  he worked as director of research and development for Birmingham AIDS Outreach. He resides in Birmingham, Alabama with his husband and former United States Marine, Michael Rudulph.

Election

References

21st-century American politicians
American LGBT military personnel
Gay military personnel
Gay politicians
LGBT state legislators in Alabama
Living people
Democratic Party members of the Alabama House of Representatives
Military personnel from Birmingham, Alabama
Politicians from Birmingham, Alabama
Year of birth missing (living people)